2019 Bandy World Championship was held in Vänersborg, Sweden, between men's national teams among bandy playing nations. It was the XXXIXth Bandy World Championship.

Host selection
The tournament was supposed to be held in Irkutsk in Russia. However, the decision was reconsidered
 and the tournament was held in Vänersborg in Sweden instead. Irkutsk might get the right to host the 2020 tournament, if FIB is given guarantees that the planned indoor arena will be ready for use in time. The Russian government has expressed its support for the building of such a stadium.

Venues

Qualified nations 
A total of 20 nations took part in the championships.

Division A

Pool A

Pool B

Division B

Division A

Preliminary round
All times are local (UTC+1).

Group A

Group B

Knockout stage

Bracket

Play-offs

Seventh place game

Fifth place game

Semifinals

Third place game

Final

Final ranking

Awards
Best players selected by the directorate:
Best Goaltender:  Kimmo Kyllönen
Best Defenceman:  Martin Johansson
Best Midfielder:  Maksim Ishkeldin
Best Forward:  Erik Pettersson
MVP:  Erik Pettersson
Fair Play:

Division B

Preliminary round

Group A

Group B

Knockout stage

Bracket

Semifinals

Eleventh place game

Ninth place game

Seventh place game

Fifth place game

Third place game

Final

Final ranking

References

External links
Official site

2019
World Championship
Bandy World Championship
Bandy World Championship
2019 in Swedish sport
International bandy competitions hosted by Sweden
Vänersborg Municipality